William Walkinshaw Reid (3 November 1903 – 1967) was a footballer from Northern Ireland who played as a centre half.

Career

Club
Reid played for several clubs, most significantly Glentoran where he won the Irish League in the 1924–25 season and played in two Irish Cup finals, Bethlehem Steel in the United States (following a short initial spell in the country with Philadelphia Field Club) where he won the American Soccer League in 1926–27 and the Eastern Soccer League in 1928–29 and 1929, and Heart of Midlothian in Scotland where he spent seven seasons and eventually captained the team.

International
While with Glentoran, Reid was selected for the Irish League XI in 1926, and while with Hearts he was capped once for Ireland in October 1930, a 5–1 defeat against England, becoming the first serving player from the Edinburgh club to feature for a national team other than Scotland.

Personal life
Reid had four older brothers who played football at a high level: Jimmy played for the Irish League XI, Davy did likewise and spent seven years with Everton, and Max and Jack had six years as midfield teammates at New Brighton. All were born in Ayrshire before the family moved to Belfast in 1900, and under eligibility rules of the time they could not play for Ireland due to their birthplace despite having lived there since they were small children; by contrast, Willie was born in Ulster so was eligible, although he was the only sibling who actually played in Scotland and was based there when he gained his Ireland cap.

References

1903 births
1967 deaths
Date of death unknown
Association footballers from Northern Ireland
Irish League representative players
Association football central defenders
Football managers from Northern Ireland
Pre-1950 IFA international footballers
People from Northern Ireland of Scottish descent
Association footballers from Belfast
Scottish Football League players
NIFL Premiership players
NIFL Premiership managers
Ballymena F.C. managers
Glentoran F.C. players
Queen's Island F.C. players
Willowfield F.C. players
Heart of Midlothian F.C. players
Dundalk F.C. players
Lisburn Distillery F.C. players
League of Ireland players
Expatriate association footballers in the Republic of Ireland
Expatriate association footballers from Northern Ireland
American Soccer League (1921–1933) players
Bethlehem Steel F.C. (1907–1930) players
Philadelphia Field Club players
New York Hungaria players
Expatriate sportspeople from Northern Ireland in the United States
Expatriate soccer players in the United States